The 2021 Louisiana–Monroe Warhawks football team represented the University of Louisiana at Monroe in the 2021 NCAA Division I FBS football season. The Warhawks played their home games at Malone Stadium in Monroe, Louisiana, and competed in the West Division of the Sun Belt Conference. They were led by first-year head coach Terry Bowden.

Previous season
The Warhawks finished the 2020 season with a 0–10 record (0–7 in conference), finishing dead last at fifth in the Sun Belt West Division. Louisiana–Monroe was not invited to any postseason competition. Following the season, head coach Matt Viator was fired after amassing a record of 19–39 over his five years serving in his capacity. Terry Bowden, son of head coach Bobby Bowden and brother of Tommy Bowden and former head coach at Salem, Samford, Auburn, North Alabama, and Akron, was hired soon after to fill the vacancy.

Preseason

Recruiting class

|}
Source:

Award watch lists
Listed in the order that they were released

Preseason

Sources:

Sun Belt coaches poll
The Sun Belt coaches poll was released on July 20, 2021. The Warhawks were picked to finish fifth in the West Division.

Personnel

Schedule
The 2021 schedule consists of 6 home and 6 away games in the regular season. The Warhawks will travel to Sun Belt foes Coastal Carolina, Appalachian State, Texas State, and Louisiana. ULM will play host to Sun Belt foes Troy, Georgia State, South Alabama, and Arkansas State.

Troy will host two of the four non-conference opponents at Malone Stadium, Jackson State, from NCAA Division I FCS Southwestern Athletic Conference and Liberty, a FBS Independent, and will travel to Kentucky and LSU, both from the Southeastern Conference.

Game summaries

at Kentucky

Jackson State

Troy

at Coastal Carolina

Georgia State

Liberty

South Alabama

at Appalachian State

at Texas State

Arkansas State

at LSU

at Louisiana

References

Louisiana-Monroe
Louisiana–Monroe Warhawks football seasons
Louisiana-Monroe Warhawks football